The Government of New South Wales, also known as the NSW Government, is the Australian state democratic administrative authority of New South Wales. It is currently held by a coalition of the Liberal Party and the National Party. The Government of New South Wales, a parliamentary constitutional monarchy, was formed in 1856 as prescribed in its Constitution, as amended from time to time. Since the Federation of Australia in 1901, New South Wales has been a state of the Commonwealth of Australia, and the Constitution of Australia regulates its relationship with the Commonwealth.  Under the Australian Constitution, New South Wales, as with all states, ceded legislative and judicial supremacy to the Commonwealth, but retained powers in all matters not in conflict with the Commonwealth.

Executive and judicial powers
New South Wales is governed according to the principles of the Westminster system, a form of parliamentary government based on the model of the United Kingdom. Legislative power rests with the Parliament of New South Wales, which consists of the Crown, represented by the Governor of New South Wales, and the two Houses, the New South Wales Legislative Council (the upper house) and the New South Wales Legislative Assembly (the lower house). Executive power rests formally with the Executive Council, which consists of the Governor and senior ministers.

The Governor, as representative of the Crown, is the formal repository of power, which is exercised by him or her on the advice of the Premier of New South Wales and the Cabinet. The Premier and Ministers are appointed by the Governor, and hold office by virtue of their ability to command the support of a majority of members of the Legislative Assembly.  Judicial power is exercised by the Supreme Court of New South Wales and a system of subordinate courts, but the High Court of Australia and other federal courts have overriding jurisdiction on matters which fall under the ambit of the Australian Constitution.

In 2006, the Sesquicentenary of Responsible Government in New South Wales, the Constitution Amendment Pledge of Loyalty Act 2006 No. 6 was enacted to amend the Constitution Act 1902 to require Members of the New South Wales Parliament and its Ministers to take a pledge of loyalty to Australia and to the people of New South Wales instead of swearing allegiance to the Queen her heirs and successors, and to revise the oaths taken by Executive Councillors. The Act was assented to by the Queen on 3 April 2006. 

On 5 June 2012, the Constitution Amendment (Restoration of Oaths of Allegiance) Act 2012 No 33 was assented to and made a further amendment to the Constitution Act 1902, by restoring the option of taking the oath of allegiance to the Queen, her heirs and successors, in addition to the option of taking the pledge of loyalty. The change applies to members of Legislative Council, Legislative Assembly and Executive Council.

Ministries

The following individuals serve as government ministers, at the pleasure of the King, represented by the Governor of New South Wales. The government ministers are listed in order of seniority as listed on the Parliament of New South Wales website and were sworn on by the Governor with effect from 21 December 2022, while their opposition counterparts are listed to correspond with the government ministers. All Opposition counterparts are members of the Parliament of New South Wales.

See also 

 List of New South Wales government agencies
 Local government areas of New South Wales
 New South Wales Ministry
 New South Wales Shadow Ministry
 Public Service Association of NSW

References

External links 
 Government of New South Wales website
 New South Wales Government Annual Reports and Other Publications
 The Constitution of New South Wales